The 1982 Star World Championships were held in Medemblik, Netherlands in 1982.

Results

References

Star World Championships
1982 in sailing
Sailing competitions in the Netherlands